Cantalamessa is an Italian surname. Notable people with the surname include:

 Raniero Cantalamessa (born 1934), Franciscan priest and theologian
 Giulio Cantalamessa (1846–1924), Italian painter and art critic

Italian-language surnames